Pierre-Louis Barassi (born 22 April 1998) is a French rugby union player who plays for Toulouse in the Top 14 and the French national team. His position is centre.

International career
He was not initially named in France's squad for the 2019 Rugby World Cup but was called up to replace the injured Wesley Fofana.

International tries

Honours

Lyon
EPCR Challenge Cup: 2021–22

France U20
Six Nations Under 20s Championship: 2018
World Rugby Under 20 Championship: 2018

References

External links 
 Lyon OU profile

1998 births
Living people
French rugby union players
RC Narbonne players
Lyon OU players
Stade Toulousain players
People from Sélestat
Rugby union centres
France international rugby union players
Sportspeople from Bas-Rhin
France international rugby sevens players